Alfie Moceulutu (born 9 July 1971) is a Fijian former rugby union footballer who played for Ospreys regional team as a flanker. He won 34 caps for Fiji, scoring 4 tries.

Moceulutu made his debut for the Ospreys regional team in 2003 having previously played for the Neath RFC, Caerphilly RFC and Honda Heat.

References

External links 
Ospreys Player Profile

Fiji international rugby union players
Fijian rugby union players
Ospreys (rugby union) players
Living people
1971 births
Mie Honda Heat players
Rugby union flankers